Omar Osvaldo De Felippe (born 3 April 1962) is an Argentine former soldier, war veteran, football coach and former football player who played as a defender.

Career
Born in Ciudad Madero, Buenos Aires, De Felippe began playing football with local side Club Atlético Huracán. He was playing for the club's third team when the Falklands War began in 1982, and he was drafted into the infantry forces fighting for Argentina.

After the war, De Felippe returned to Huracán, where he would make his debut in the Argentine Primera División. He had a brief spell playing in Colombia with Cristal Caldas, before returning to Argentina to play in the regional leagues with Club Olimpo, Club Villa Mitre, Arsenal de Sarandí and Club Atlético San Telmo.

After he retired from playing, De Felippe began a career as a football manager. He led Club Olimpo, Quilmes Atlético Club and Club Atlético Independiente through promotion to the Primera División.

Personal
De Felippe's brother, Walter Fabián, is a former professional footballer who also played in the Primera División with Huracán.

References

External links

1962 births
Living people
Sportspeople from Buenos Aires Province
Argentine footballers
Association football defenders
Argentine Primera División players
Club Atlético Huracán footballers
Olimpo footballers
Villa Mitre footballers
Arsenal de Sarandí footballers
San Telmo footballers
Once Caldas footballers
Argentine football managers
Club Atlético Independiente managers
Argentine military personnel of the Falklands War
C.S. Emelec managers
Quilmes Atlético Club managers
Olimpo managers
Club Atlético Vélez Sarsfield managers
Newell's Old Boys managers
Atlético Tucumán managers
Club Atlético Platense managers